Madison Park is an unincorporated community and census-designated place (CDP) located within Old Bridge Township, in Middlesex County, New Jersey, United States. As of the 2010 United States Census, the CDP's population was 7,144. The name "Madison Park" reflects Old Bridge's original name of "Madison Township" which it had when it was formed on March 2, 1869 from portions of South Amboy Township, until November 5, 1975, when voters approved a referendum changing the township's name to Old Bridge Township.

Madison Park is the name of a residential development constructed in 1955-1956 by Herbert J. Kendall. It is located west of U.S. Route 9 bounded by Bordentown Avenue, Cheesequake Road, and Ernston Road. Portions of Madison Park are served by ZIP Code 08859 for Parlin, New Jersey. Madison Park has a fire department (District 4 Old Bridge Township), a volunteer first aid squad, and a school all located within the development. All of the streets in the development are named after prominent universities, with Princeton Road as an oval interior road connecting to the entire development.

Geography
According to the United States Census Bureau, the CDP had a total area of 1.687 square miles (4.368 km2), including 1.659 square miles (4.296 km2) of land and 0.028 square miles (0.071 km2) of water (1.64%).

Demographics

Census 2010

Census 2000
As of the 2000 United States Census there were 6,929 people, 730 households, and 730 families living in the CDP. The population density was 1,631.3/km2 (4,216.1/mi2). There were 730 housing units at an average density of 596.3/km2 (1,541.3/mi2). The racial makeup of the CDP was 56.36% White, 13.75% African American, 0.10% Native American, 19.97% Asian, 0.12% Pacific Islander, 4.17% from other races, and 5.53% from two or more races. Hispanic or Latino of any race were 13.05% of the population.

There were 730 households, out of which 39.1% had children under the age of 18 living with them, 53.7% were married couples living together, 12.5% had a female householder with no husband present, and 28.2% were non-families. 23.2% of all households were made up of individuals, and 5.3% had someone living alone who was 65 years of age or older. The average household size was 2.81 and the average family size was 3.37.

In the CDP the population was spread out, with 27.2% under the age of 18, 8.3% from 18 to 24, 35.9% from 25 to 44, 20.3% from 45 to 64, and 8.3% who were 65 years of age or older. The median age was 34 years. For every 100 females, there were 95.7 males. For every 100 females age 18 and over, there were 91.7 males.

The median income for a household in the CDP was $52,263, and the median income for a family was $56,025. Males had a median income of $40,766 versus $31,890 for females. The per capita income for the CDP was $21,622. About 6.0% of families and 8.0% of the population were below the poverty line, including 10.5% of those under age 18 and 7.9% of those age 65 or over.

References

Census-designated places in Middlesex County, New Jersey
Old Bridge Township, New Jersey